Bisagno is an Italian surname. Notable people with the surname include:

 Gilio Bisagno (1903–1987), Italian swimmer
 Tommaso Bisagno (1935–2014), Italian academic and politician

See also
 Bisagno, a river in Liguria

Italian-language surnames